Terry Blade is an American singer-songwriter based in Chicago, Illinois. Since 2020, he has received more than 70 music, film and video awards and nominations. His 2020 debut single The Unloveable received a singer-songwriter nomination at the 11th Hollywood Music in Media Awards. 

In 2021, his debut album American Descendant of Slavery, the Album was named in the Archives of African American Music & Culture's "February 2021 Black Music Releases of Note" alongside R&B and Soul releases by Jose James, Joshua Henry, Kelly Rowland, Nat Turner Rebellion, Pink Sweats, The Chi-Lites, The Jacksons, and Trippie Redd. The album also received an accolade from Something Else Reviews, which ranked it second on its "Best of 2021 Rock, Pop and R&B"—a list that included albums by Alan Clark, Joseph Williams, Peter Frampton, Tony Kaye, and Yes. The album and its lead single Black Hurts went on to win a combined seventeen awards, including awards for Best Original Song and Best Black Music Video at the Munich Music Video Awards, and the Gold Medal of Excellence Award for Lyrics/Songwriting at the Global Music Awards.

In 2022, his second studio album Neo Queer won the Gold Medal of Excellence Award for Neo Soul at the Global Music Awards. In 2023, his Blues single Won't Be Around entered the Spotify Local Pulse Charts for New York City and Houston. The song is currently nominated for a 2023 Hollywood Independent Music Award in the Americana/Roots category. The song also appears on his third studio album Ethos: Son of a Sharecropper which was featured on The Boot.com's "Most Wanted Music: 2023's Country and Americana Album Releases" along with album releases by Shania Twain, Margo Price, John-Allison Weiss, Elle King, and Mark Erelli. The album's closing Gospel Blues song In My House won him the Best Vocalist award at the 2023 Music Video Awards.

Personal life 
Terry is originally from Washington, DC. He identifies as a member of the LGBTQ+ community.

Discography

Studio Albums
American Descendant of Slavery, the Album (2021)
Neo Queer (2022)
Ethos: Son of a Sharecropper (2023)

Extended Plays
Misery (2020)
Unmastered: The Demo Sessions (2021)
The 4 Miseries (2021)

Singles
The Unloveable (2020)
Brooms & Mops (2020)
Strange Fruit (2020) (Cover)
That's Alright Mama (2020) (Cover)
The Karen Blues (2020)
Gibberish (2021)
Elixir (2021)
Railroad Tracks (2022)
For You (2022)
Blue feat. Charlie J (2022)
Brutus (2022)
Won't Be Around (2023)

Videography

Music Videos 
The Unloveable (Directed by Terry Blade) (2020)
The Widow (Directed by Hibiscus Cloudberry) (2020)
The Last Macbeth (Directed by Terry Blade) (2020)
Crawling (Directed by Jay Carney) (2020) (Cover)
Tomorrow (Directed by Terry Blade) (2020)
Mr. Robertson (Directed by Terry Blade) (2020)
Black Hurts (Directed by Terry Blade) (2021)
Gibberish (Directed by Terry Blade) (2021)
Eaten Alive (Directed by Terry Blade) (2022)
Blue feat. Charlie J (Directed by Terry Blade) (2023)

Awards and Nominations

See also 

 List of singer-songwriters
 List of crooners
 List of LGBT African-Americans
 List of LGBT people from Chicago
 List of baritones in non-classical music
 List of African-American singers
 2021 in American music
 2023 in American music

References 

Year of birth missing (living people)
Living people
Place of birth missing (living people)
Musicians from Chicago
Singer-songwriters from Illinois
American LGBT singers
American LGBT songwriters
LGBT African Americans
African-American musicians
American baritones
Queer singers
Queer songwriters
African-American male singer-songwriters
African-American male singers
21st-century American LGBT people
21st-century African-American male singers